Don Weis (May 13, 1922 – July 26, 2000) was an American film and television director.

Biography

Weis was born in Milwaukee, Wisconsin to Emma (née Wiener; 1889–1971) and Meyer Weis (1886-1942). He graduated from the University of Southern California where he studied film. During World War II, Weis served in the Air Force as a film technician. After the war, he began working at MGM directing such films as Bannerline (1951), Just This Once (1952), You for Me (1952) and The Affairs of Dobie Gillis (1953).

Weis began directing for television in 1954 and worked on such series as M*A*S*H, Ironside, It Takes a Thief, Twilight Zone, Alfred Hitchcock Presents (1955), The Andy Griffith Show, 
Happy Days, Starsky and Hutch, CHiPs, The Courtship of Eddie's Father, Hawaii Five-O, The Andros Targets, and The San Pedro Beach Bums, among others.

Weis won two Directors Guild of America Awards for television direction in 1956 and again in 1958.

Weis married Dori in 1950. They had two daughters together, Deborah and Pamela, before they divorced in 1955. Weis married actress Rebecca Welles on August 25, 1961, in Los Angeles. Welles had two daughters from a previous marriage, Elizabeth and actress Gwen Welles.

Weis died in Los Angeles in 2000, at 78 years of age. He was interred in Santa Fe, New Mexico at the Santa Fe National Cemetery. Rebecca was interred beside him upon her passing in 2017.

Selected filmography
Bannerline (1951)
Just This Once (1952)
You for Me (1952)
I Love Melvin (1953)
The Affairs of Dobie Gillis (1953)
The Adventures of Hajji Baba (1954)
 Ride the High Iron (1956)
Catch Me If You Can (1959)
The Gene Krupa Story (1959)
Critic's Choice (1963)
Pajama Party (1964)
Billie (1965)
The Ghost in the Invisible Bikini (1966)
The King's Pirate (1967)

References

 "Don Weis; Film, Television Director", Los Angeles Times, August 3, 2000.
 "Don Weis, 78, Film and Television Director", The New York Times, August 4, 2000.
 "Obituary: Don Weis", The Independent (London),  August 16, 2000.

External links
 
 

1922 births
2000 deaths
Jewish American military personnel
Film directors from Wisconsin
American television directors
Artists from Milwaukee
USC School of Cinematic Arts alumni
First Motion Picture Unit personnel
20th-century American Jews